Warner Norcross + Judd LLP is a corporate law firm with over 230 attorneys serving clients in eight offices throughout Michigan.  Among the largest law firms in Michigan, Warner Norcross works in virtually all areas of business law.

Practice areas 
Key practice areas include litigation, corporate law, labor and employment law, employee benefits law, environmental law, financial services, real estate and construction, health care and trusts and estates. The firm has also developed several niche practice areas, including automotive suppliers, brownfield financial incentives, mining, family office and closely held businesses.

History 

Warner Norcross traces its roots to May 1, 1931, when three attorneys from West Michigan joined forces to launch the law firm in Grand Rapids.   David A. Warner, George S. Norcross and Siegel W. Judd brought varied business and legal experience to Warner Norcross + Judd, which handled a broad range of corporate work, including securities, reorganizations, real estate transactions and bankruptcies.

Notable attorneys and alumni 

U.S. Congressman Hal Sawyer
U.S. Congressman Guy Vander Jagt
Honorable Robert J. Jonker, U.S. District Court for the Western District of Michigan
Wolverine World Wide CEO Blake Krueger
Bill Schuette, former U.S. Congressman and Michigan Court of Appeals judge, former Michigan Attorney General
John H. Logie, former Grand Rapids Mayor
John J. Bursch, former Michigan Solicitor General

Significant litigation and transactions

Taco Bell trademark litigation, $30.1 million judgment
Amway, $26 million litigation win over non-compete, non-solicit and trade secret claims

Honors and awards

90 attorneys listed in Best Lawyers in America 2017
14 attorneys recognized as Lawyers of the Year in individual practice areas around Michigan by Best Lawyers 2017
55 attorneys listed in Michigan Super Lawyers 2016
26 attorneys listed as Rising Stars by Michigan Super Lawyers 2016
Listed as a Leading Michigan law firm in several practices areas by Chambers USA 2017
8 attorneys recognized by Chambers USA 2017
15 attorneys recognized as 2017 Top Lawyers by  Magazine
Named as a Best Medium Workplace by Great Place to Work®.
Cool Places to Work, Crain's Detroit Business
Business Excellence in Workplace Flexibility, Alfred P. Sloan Award 2010
101 Best Places to Work, Grand Rapids and Metro Detroit

References

External links
Warner Norcross + Judd website

Law firms established in 1931
Companies based in Grand Rapids, Michigan
Law firms based in Michigan
1931 establishments in Michigan